= Padariya Jat =

- village
- Location within Madhya Pradesh Location within India
- Coordinates: 23.1886633°N 77.5580013°E
- Country: India
- State: Madhya Pradesh
- District: Bhopal
- Tehsil: Huzur

Government
  - SARPANCH: RAGHUVEER MEENA (Bhartiya Janta Party)
- Elevation: 446 m (1,463 ft)

Population (2011)
  - Total: 545
- Time zone: UTC+5:30 (IST)
- ISO 3166 code: MP-IN
- 2011 census code: 482448

Padariya is a village in the Bhopal district of Madhya Pradesh, India. It is located in the Huzur tehsil and the Phanda block.

== Demographics ==
According to the 2011 census of India, Padariya Jat has 100 households. The effective literacy rate (i.e. the literacy rate of population excluding children aged 6 and below) is 63.79%.

Demographics (2011 Census)
	Total	Male	Female
Population	545	288	257
Children aged below 6 years	70	34	36
Scheduled caste	121	59	62
Scheduled tribe	0	0	0
Literates	303	187	116
Workers (all)	162	144	18
Main workers (total)	161	143	18
Main workers: Cultivators	90	85	5
Main workers: Agricultural labourers	42	35	7
Main workers: Household industry workers	0	0	0
Main workers: Other	29	23	6
Marginal workers (total)	1	1	0
Marginal workers: Cultivators	0	0	0
Marginal workers: Agricultural labourers	1	1	0
Marginal workers: Household industry workers	0	0	0
Marginal workers: Others	0	0	0
Non-workers	383	144	239
